Pádraig Boyle (born 3 December 1993) is an Irish hurler who plays for Kerry Senior Championship club Ballyduff and at inter-county level with the Kerry senior hurling team. He usually lines out as a forward.

Career

A member of the Ballyduff club, Boyle first came to prominence at underage levels by winning minor and under-21 championship titles. He progressed onto the club's senior team and has since won four County Championship titles. Boyle first came to prominence on the inter-county scene as a member of the Kerry minor and under-21 teams that won All-Ireland titles in the respective second tier championships. He was still eligible for the minor grade when he was drafted onto the Kerry senior hurling team in 2011, ending the season with a Christy Ring Cup title. He won a second Ring Cup winners' medal in 2015 and has also won consecutive National League Division 2A titles.	Boyle's brothers Mikey, Liam and Aidan have also played with Kerry.

Career statistics

Honours

Ballyduff
Kerry Senior Hurling Championship: 2010, 2011, 2012, 2017
Kerry Under-21 Hurling Championship: 2010, 2013

Kerry
Christy Ring Cup: 2011, 2015
National Hurling League Division 2A: 2014, 2015
All-Ireland Under-21 B Hurling Championship: 2010, 2011, 2013
All-Ireland Minor B Hurling Championship: 2009

References

1993 births
Living people
Ballyduff (Kerry) hurlers
Kerry inter-county hurlers
Kerry inter-county Gaelic footballers